Toxicity is a measure of the degree to which something is toxic or poisonous. 

Toxic, toxicity, or similar terms may also refer to:

Science

Biology
 Toxicant, a chemical compound having an effect on living organisms
 Toxin, a substance produced by living cells or organisms
 Mycotoxin, toxins produced by fungi

Psychology and social sciences
 Anti-social behaviour
 Toxic femininity
 Toxic leader
 Toxic masculinity
 Toxic workplace

Arts, entertainment, and media

Music
 Toxic (album), a 2011 album by the Gazette
 Toxicity (album), a 2001 album by System of a Down
 "Toxicity" (song), the album's title track
 "Toxic" (song), a 2003 song by Britney Spears
 "Toxic" (YG song), a 2022 song by YG
 "Toxic", a song by 2WEI
 “Toxic”, a song by BoyWithUke
 "Toxic", a song by Ashnikko from Demidevil
 "Toxic", a song by Kehlani from It Was Good Until It Wasn't
 "Toxic", a song by Crazy Town from The Gift of Game
Toxik, an American thrash metal band

Other arts, entertainment, and media
 Toxic (graffiti artist), born 1965
Toxic (film), a 2010 thriller film
 Toxic (magazine), a British boys' magazine and comic, 2000s
 Toxic! (1990s comic), a British comic
Toxikk, a 2015 video game
A gamer slang term for poor player behavior